This article describes the video game. For the underlying sport, see Street football (American).

Backyard Football is a series of video games for various systems. The series was developed by Humongous Entertainment and published by Infogrames, Atari and The Evergreen Group. It is one of several sub-series in the Backyard Sports series, and is the first to feature professional players as kids, examples being Steve Young and Barry Sanders. The series currently has eleven titles.

Backyard Football attempts to recreate the experience of playing American football as children.

Titles

Backyard Football
Backyard Football, the third "Backyard" game, was developed by Humongous Entertainment and published by GT Interactive in 1999. In it, kids and professional football players as kids play football. There are three types of gameplay available in Backyard Football. The first one is a single game. At the single game screen, the player can select the field on which they wish to play, the weather (between sunny, where the players are able to run very quickly; rainy, in which the players are slowed somewhat and the ball is difficult to throw; and snowy, where players are slowed considerably), and the level of difficulty (between easy, medium, and hard), among various other minor settings. They then pick their team name, which can be any of the then-31 NFL teams and 10 backyard teams. When the team is chosen, a player would take turns choosing players with the CPU. There are a total of seven players on a team, two of which will be on the bench, while five get to see action. The statistics of a player in single game mode have no effect on a player's statistics in season play.

The second type of gameplay is season mode. The player selects their coach name, settings, and team before the season and drafts all seven of their players before the CPU picks any for the rest of the computer controlled teams in the league. The coach guides their team through a 14-game season, at the end of which if they are to win their division or be picked as the wild card, the team will compete in the playoffs. Eight teams, four from each conference, compete in three rounds of games to determine the winner of the "Super Colossal Cereal Bowl" (which is a spoof of the Super Bowl in the NFL).

The third type of gameplay is online play. Backyard Football is the only game, along with Backyard Baseball 2001, that offers online play with players across the globe. Online play is hosted through the Junior Sports Network, and is only available for Windows users, since the network system does not support Macintosh. Like Backyard Baseball 2001, there are three difficulty areas: Easy Streets, Mediumville, and Toughy Town. The harder the difficulty, it becomes less likely that the players out on the field are going to make magnificent plays to "bail the coach out". While playing online, the player may make contact with another coach online. They may then chat with each other with only pre-written dialogue, since the network is not being monitored to make sure no inappropriate language is used. Since www.jrsn.com has been discontinued, no new coach names may be registered to play online. However in 2021, a member named LittleToonCat has recreated the servers from scratch running on Node.js and using an online-enabled ScummVM build as the client to connect to the new servers which was released as Backyard Sports Online. The source codes for the server, session, and the ScummVM client have been made open-source by the creator.

Backyard Football 2002
Backyard Football 2002 was developed by Humongous Entertainment and published by Infogrames in 2001 for Windows and Macintosh. A planned release for the Game Boy Color was cancelled. In this game, one can play as their favorite NFL stars as kids. Brett Favre and Drew Bledsoe, who both appear in the first Backyard Football, returns in this game. The goal of the game is to lead a team to Cereal Bowl glory. Updated versions of the game were published yearly on various platforms through Backyard Football 2006. This is also the only SCUMM game to use LAN play instead of online services.

Backyard Sports Football 2007
Backyard Sports Football 2007 was developed by Humongous Entertainment and published by Atari in 2006 for the Game Boy Advance. Like the previous installment in the series, Backyard Sports Football 2007 featured the ability to create own player, build own team, play exhibition games or a season mode, and play as a number of NFL players as their childhood lookalikes. It also added 7-on-7 gameplay for the first time. Backyard Sports Football 2007 received negative reviews, being criticized for its repetitive sound and poor gameplay. The sound is described was described as "annoying, repetitious music" by a reviewer at GameZone. The gameplay was described as poor by the same reviewer due to "irresponsive controls" and a lack of playbook options.

Backyard Football '08

Backyard Football '08 was released in 2007 for the Wii, PlayStation 2, Nintendo DS, and PC. Humongous Entertainment handled development, with assistance by FarSight Studios and Torus Games. It was published by Atari. The game allows the player to play as child versions of professional football players from all current NFL teams, as well as play entire football seasons as any of the 16 teams.

IGN rated the Wii version of the game a 6/10 and criticized it for having controls that may be hard for a younger audience to understand, while praising its commentary for being funny.

Backyard Football '09

Backyard Football '09 was developed and published by the same studios as the previous installment, and released on the same systems in 2008. The game includes all 22 backyard kids and 15 professional players as kids. Professional players include Tom Brady, Peyton Manning, Tony Romo, LaDainian Tomlinson, Brian Urlacher, Reggie Bush, Chris Cooley and Frank Gore and more. Along with the NFL players, most of the classic backyard kids are in the game including Pete Wheeler, Pablo Sanchez, and Ernie Steele. Both of the commentators, Chuck Downfield and Sunny Day, are also from previous games of the series.

Backyard Football '09 was said to be "repetitive with its commentary" and "made too simple and easy" from many reviews. The reviews state that the game targets more of a pre-teen audience.

Backyard Football '10

Backyard Football '10 was developed by Humongous Entertainment and published by Atari in 2009 for the Xbox 360, Wii, and PlayStation 2. The game features "Single Player", "Season," "Tournament", and "All Pro" modes, along with the multiplayer modes of co-op play and two-on-two contests.

The game received mixed reviews for the Xbox 360 and Wii versions, but negative reviews for the PS2 version. For the Xbox 360 version, ZTGameDomain said that the game is "simple, easy to pick up and really well designed".

Backyard Sports: Rookie Rush
Backyard Sports: Rookie Rush was developed by Humongous Entertainment and published by Atari in 2010 for the Xbox 360, Wii, Microsoft Windows, and Nintendo DS. This title features the previously created "Pick-up Games", "Season Mode", and "Tournament", and introduces two new styles of gameplay, "Story Mode" and "Mini-Games".

Common Sense Media gave the game 4 out of 5 stars. The game received 2 out of 5 stars from AllGame.

References

External links
 

Humongous Entertainment games
Infogrames games
Atari games
National Football League video games
ScummVM-supported games
Cancelled Game Boy Color games
Video game franchises
Multiplayer and single-player video games